Richard "Dick" Norris Williams II (January 29, 1891 – June 2, 1968), generally known as R. Norris Williams, was an American tennis player and RMS Titanic survivor.

Biography

Williams was born in Geneva, Switzerland, the son of Philadelphia parents Charles Duane Williams, a direct descendant from Benjamin Franklin, and Lydia Biddle White. He was tutored privately at a Swiss boarding school and spoke fluent French and German. He started playing tennis at age 12, mainly under the guidance of his father.

On January 11, 1919 in Paris, France, Williams married Jean Haddock (1890–1929), daughter of Arthur Henry and Matilda (Stewart) Haddock. They had four children. Jean died aged 38 on April 20, 1929 in Philadelphia. Williams remarried to Frances West Gillmore (1908–2001), daughter of Major General Quincy Adams Gillmore II and Frances West (Hemsley) Gillmore, on October 2, 1930. She was a great-granddaughter of Quincy Adams Gillmore.

Tennis career

In 1911 Williams won the Swiss Championship. A year later he entered Harvard University and became the intercollegiate tennis champion in singles (1913, 1915) and doubles (1914, 1915).

Williams is best known for his two men's singles titles at the U.S. Championships in 1914 (beating Maurice McLoughlin in the final) and 1916 (beating Bill Johnston in the final). He was also on the victorious American Davis Cup team twice: in 1925 and 1926 and was considered a fine doubles player. He also had a reputation in singles of always hitting as hard as possible and always trying to hit winners near the lines. This made him an extremely erratic player, but when his game was sporadically "on", he was considered unbeatable. New York Times tennis writer Allison Danzig claimed that Williams had “one of the most daring attacks tennis had seen. He never played safe. He stood in close, took the ball on the rise, often on the half volley, and played for the lines.”  “At his best he was unbeatable, and more dazzling than Tilden."

During the 1924 Olympics, at the age of 33 (and with a sprained ankle), Richard Norris Williams became a Gold Medalist in the mixed doubles, partnering Hazel Hotchkiss Wightman. He went on to captain several winning Davis Cup teams from 1921 through 1926 as well as the 1934 team. At age 44, he retired from Championship Tennis.

He was inducted into the International Tennis Hall of Fame (Newport, Rhode Island) in 1957.

RMS Titanic
Williams also gained fame as being a survivor of the RMS Titanic disaster in April 1912. He and his father, Charles Duane Williams, were traveling first class on the liner when it struck an iceberg and sank. Shortly after the collision, Williams freed a trapped passenger from a cabin by breaking down a door. He was reprimanded by a steward, who threatened to fine him for damaging White Star Line property, an event that inspired a scene in James Cameron's film Titanic (1997). Williams remained on the doomed liner almost until the very end. At one point Williams' father tried to get a steward to fill his flask. The flask was given to Williams and remains in the Williams family.

As Titanic began her final plunge, father and son jumped into the water. While Dick was able to save himself, his father was killed by the first funnel falling from the ship. The 21-year-old Williams recalled, "I saw one of the four great funnels come crashing down on top of him. Just for one instant I stood there transfixed – not because it had only missed me by a few feet … curiously enough not because it had killed my father for whom I had a far more than normal feeling of love and attachment; but there I was transfixed wondering at the enormous size of this funnel, still belching smoke. It seemed to me that two cars could have been driven through it side by side." He made his way to the partially-submerged Collapsible A, holding onto its side for quite a while before getting in. When Williams entered the water, he was wearing a fur coat which he quickly discarded along with his shoes. Those in Collapsible A who survived were transferred to Collapsible Boat D, which reached RMS Carpathia. Although abandoned by RMS Carpathia, Collapsible A was recovered a month later. Onboard the lifeboat was the discarded fur coat which was returned to Williams by White Star.

After entering the lifeboat, he spent several hours knee-deep in the freezing water. Carpathia arrived on the scene to rescue survivors. The ordeal left his legs so severely frostbitten that the Carpathias doctor wanted to amputate them. Williams, who did not want his tennis career to be cut short, opted instead to work through the injury by simply getting up and walking around every two hours, around the clock. The choice worked out well for him: later that year, he won his first U.S. Tennis Championship, in mixed doubles, and went on to win many more championships including the Davis Cup with fellow survivor Karl Behr.

It was not until after the publication of A Night to Remember (1955), a book about the Titanic disaster, that Williams became acquainted with its author Walter Lord. In 1962, Williams met with Lord and gave a detailed account of the sinking.

Military service, business career, historical society
Williams served in the United States Army during World War I and was awarded the Croix de Guerre and the Legion of Honor. After the war, he continued playing championship tennis.

Williams, also a noted Philadelphia investment banker, was president of the Historical Society of Pennsylvania.

Death

Richard Norris Williams died of emphysema on June 2, 1968, aged 77, in Bryn Mawr, Pennsylvania. He was interred at St. David's Episcopal Church in Radnor, Pennsylvania.

Grand Slam finals

Singles: 3 (2 titles, 1 runner-up)

Doubles: 7 (3 titles, 4 runners-up)

Mixed doubles: 1 title

References

External links
 
 
 
 
 R. Norris Williams collection of World War I material, Kislak Center for Special Collections, Rare Books and Manuscripts, University of Pennsylvania.

1891 births
1968 deaths
American expatriates in Switzerland
American male tennis players
Burials at St. David's Episcopal Church (Radnor, Pennsylvania)
Deaths from emphysema
Grand Slam (tennis) champions in men's doubles
Grand Slam (tennis) champions in men's singles
Grand Slam (tennis) champions in mixed doubles
Harvard Crimson men's tennis players
International Tennis Hall of Fame inductees
Medalists at the 1924 Summer Olympics
Olympic gold medalists for the United States in tennis
Recipients of the Legion of Honour
RMS Titanic's crew and passengers
RMS Titanic survivors
Tennis players from Geneva
Tennis players from Philadelphia
Tennis players at the 1924 Summer Olympics
United States Army officers
United States Army personnel of World War I
United States National champions (tennis)
Wimbledon champions (pre-Open Era)